Marvin Gaye's Greatest Hits is a compilation album released by American R&B/soul singer and Motown legend Marvin Gaye, released on the Motown label in 1976 on LP and 1987 on CD. 
The hits collection, with the exception of Gaye's signature 1960s hits "Can I Get a Witness", "How Sweet It Is (To Be Loved By You)" and "I Heard It Through the Grapevine", was a review of Gaye's signature 1970s hits including the socially conscious anthems "What's Going On" and "Mercy Mercy Me (The Ecology)", erotically-focused material like "Let's Get It On", "I Want You" and "After the Dance", his bluesy and funky autobiographical "Trouble Man" and the live version of his quiet storm classic, "Distant Lover". The album has received a Gold as well as a Platinum Certification by the RIAA in 1993.

Track listing

Certifications

References

1976 greatest hits albums
Albums produced by Norman Whitfield
Albums produced by Marvin Gaye
Albums produced by Leon Ware
Marvin Gaye compilation albums
Motown compilation albums